Melanie Roberts (born 13 May 1988 in Saltney, Flintshire, Wales) is a retired British gymnast.

At the age of five, Roberts started gymnastics at the Northgate Arena Leisure Centre in Chester.  She later joined the City of Liverpool gym club.

In 2002, Roberts was named to the British team for the Junior European Championships even though her earlier rankings (20th and 18th) at the British Espoir Championships had not been strong. Her balance beam routine was one of the few performances by a junior to be broadcast on Greek television, which brought her considerable popularity. She performed strongly at a number of competitions in 2002 before an elbow injury in 2003. After recovering, she resumed competition, including taking gold on the balance beam at the Northern European Gymnastics Championships in Lisburn in 2005.

Notes

References
 The British Gym Net

External links
 
 

1988 births
Living people
British female artistic gymnasts
Gymnasts at the 2006 Commonwealth Games
People from Saltney
Sportspeople from Flintshire
Commonwealth Games competitors for Wales
21st-century British women